Rahbeh, Rahbé, is a city located in Akkar Governorate, Lebanon. The dwellers are Greek-Orthodox and other confessions. In 2009, there were 6,133 eligible  voters in Rahbeh.

History
In 1838, Eli Smith noted the village, whose inhabitants were "Greek" Christians, located south of esh-Sheikh Mohammed. 

Rahbeh is the second biggest village (in North Lebanon) having Christian-Orthodox population.
It is known for having 365 springs and is reputed for making Lebanon's best shanklish.

Public figures residing in Rahbeh included: Elijah Gerges, Dr Wissam Mansour, owner of one of the best laboratories in Lebanon; Nicolas Mansour, first investigating judge of Mount Lebanon; Suzanne Mansour, Notary public in Zouk Mikael/Jounieh; Georges Mansour, Lawyer; Elie Mansour, engineer and owner of « Mansour Inara »

References

Bibliography

External links
 Rahbeh, Localiban

Populated places in Akkar District
Eastern Orthodox Christian communities in Lebanon